Reliance Creek is a national park in Queensland, Australia, 818 km northwest of Brisbane and about 17km north-east of Mackay.

Contains remnant palm forest that was once common to the coastal plain. It is the most intact example of coastal palm forest in the region, an ecosystem that was once prolific.

See also

 Protected areas of Queensland

References 

National parks of Queensland
Protected areas established in 1980
North Queensland